Waheed Alli, Baron Alli (born 16 November 1964) is a British media entrepreneur and politician. He is the co-creator of the television series Survivor and has held executive positions at several television production companies including the Endemol Shine Group, Carlton Television Productions (now ITV Studios), Planet 24, and Chorion.

He served as the Chief Executive of Silvergate Media until 2022, Chairman of Koovs Plc and a director at Olga Productions. He is a member of the House of Lords in the United Kingdom, sitting as a life peer for the Labour Party, and is described as one of only a few openly gay Muslim politicians in the world.

Biography
In British political terms he is considered Asian, because both of his parents are Indo-Caribbean. His mother, a nurse, is an Indo-Trinidadian from Trinidad and Tobago, and his estranged father, a mechanic, is an Indo-Guyanese from Guyana. His mother was Hindu and his father Muslim; he has two brothers, one Hindu and the other Muslim. He was named one of the 20 most important Asians in British media in 2005. At the same time, he maintains ties with his Caribbean roots, both with other British-Guyanese politicians such as Valerie Amos and Trevor Phillips, and with President Bharrat Jagdeo.

He is one of a group of highly successful Guyanese people in Britain (Michael White of The Guardian refers to them as the "Guyanese mafia"), which includes Raj Persaud, Herman Ouseley and David Dabydeen, Cynthia Pine, Keith Waithe and Rudolph Dunbar.

Alli attended Stanley Technical College in South Norwood and left school at 16 with nine O-levels.

Business career
Alli started work as a junior researcher for a finance magazine, crediting his first success to Salem Ghayar, who hired and mentored him.  After a few years of preparing monthly reports for potential investors, he was headhunted by Save & Prosper, part of Robert Fleming & Co. Eventually he returned to his original employer, and worked his way up in the media business within Robert Maxwell's stable of publications.  He then went to the City for a second career in investment banking, through which he became wealthy. In the mid-1980s he met Charlie Parsons, who was to become his business partner as well as his life partner.

Alli's third career, and the first in which he achieved public prominence, was in the television industry.  He and Parsons set up 24 Hour Productions, which produced The Word, "the most talked about television programme in Britain". In 1992 they merged with Bob Geldof's Planet Pictures to form Planet 24.  Such was its success that it became one of the largest TV production companies in the country, and the main independent supplier to Channel 4. It was responsible for genre-breaking programmes such as Big Breakfast and Survivor. Carlton Television bought Planet 24 in March 1999 for £15 million, with Alli and Parsons prudently retaining the rights to the lucrative Survivor format. Waheed Alli became a Carlton board director before stepping down a year later.

In April 2003 Alli took over as chairman of the media rights company Chorion Ltd, which owns rights to Enid Blyton and Agatha Christie, and has offices beyond the UK in New York, Sydney, and Tokyo. He was chairman of AIM-listed ASOS.com and a director of Olga Television, entertainer Paul O'Grady's production company. He owns part of Shine Limited, a media production company he co-founded in March 2001 with Elisabeth Murdoch, daughter of media-magnate Rupert Murdoch. In August 2011, he stepped down from the chairmanship of Chorion and sold half his stake in ASOS.com to start a new company called Silvergate Media.

He was part of a failed £100m bid backed by private equity firm 3i to buy Virgin Radio from SMG plc in 2005. In March 2007 he was appointed as SMG's non-executive director.

Alli was a founder investor in Koovs, an Indian online retailer looking to replicate the success of ASOS in the subcontinent. The company was set up in 2012, intending to raise £22m with a stock market listing on London's AIM.
In December 2019 the company went into administration after funding could not be found.

The administration of Koovs has now been extended due to shareholders' concerns,  FRP Advisory state this in their most recent update to the market.

Politics
Alli joined the Labour Party at the persuasion of his neighbour Emily Thornberry, to whom he remains close. He is also close to Anji Hunter, Director of Government Relations in Tony Blair's first government. Prime Minister Blair used him for years as a means to help him reach out to a younger generation (aka "yoof culture"), and as such he is considered one of "Tony's Cronies". He was made a life peer as Baron Alli, of Norbury in the London Borough of Croydon, on 18 July 1998 at the age of 34, becoming the youngest and the first openly gay peer in Parliament. He sits on the Labour benches in the House of Lords. The BBC summarised his appointment as "the antithesis of the stereotypical 'establishment' peer – young, Asian and from the world of media and entertainment".

Alli has used his political position to argue for gay rights. He spearheaded the campaign to repeal Section 28. He advocated lowering the age of consent for homosexuals from 18 to 16, equal to heterosexuals; this eventually became law as the Sexual Offences (Amendment) Act 2000. It was during a heated exchange with conservative opponents, led by Baroness Young, that he informed his fellow peers that he was gay. In April 1999, he said in a speech, "I have never been confused about my sexuality. I have been confused about the way I am treated as a result of it. The only confusion lies in the prejudice shown, some of it tonight [i.e. in the House], and much of it enshrined in the law."

In 2006, he participated the International Conference on LGBT Human Rights adopting Declaration of Montreal and in 2009, he spearheaded an effort to repeal clauses in the Civil Partnership Act 2004 which prohibited religious institutions from conducting the ceremonies on their premises. This campaign culminated in a bipartisan amendment, which became part of the Equality Act 2010. He influenced the draft Communications Bill in 2003.

Other activities
Alli's work has been focused around gay rights, youth and education.  He is the former Chancellor of De Montfort University in Leicester. He is also the President of the Croydon Youth Development Trust. He is a patron of Skillset, the Sector Skills Council supporting skills and training within the creative media industries.

In Autumn 2008 he won a Stonewall Award for the category of political figure. In 2002 he became a patron of The Albert Kennedy Trust, stating: "Being a teenager isn't easy and it's particularly difficult for vulnerable and socially excluded members of our community. The Albert Kennedy Trust offers young gay men, lesbians and bisexuals a unique and targeted service. My first task as Patron will be to support plans to extend these services across the UK, to help the increasing number of young people contacting the Trust." He was a keynote speaker at the International Conference on LGBT Human Rights, part of the 2006 World Outgames, which led to the Declaration of Montreal. Alli is a patron of Oxford Pride, the annual Pride event in Oxfordshire, and of Pride London. He is a patron of the Elton John AIDS Foundation.

A portrait of Alli is in the National Portrait Gallery collection, which contains "portraits of the Nation's great men and women".

References

External links

Announcement of his introduction at the House of Lords, House of Lords minutes of proceedings, 21 July 1998
Oxford Pride
 BBC profile, 29 November 2000.
Asians in Media profile, 2005.
Caribbean Voice profile, October 2001.
Knitting Circle profile, with press cuttings
The Albert Kennedy Trust

1964 births
Living people
British politicians of Indian descent
Gay politicians
Gay businessmen
Gay Muslims
English businesspeople
Labour Party (UK) life peers
English people of Indo-Guyanese descent
English people of Indo-Trinidadian descent
English Muslims
People associated with De Montfort University
British LGBT businesspeople
English LGBT politicians
LGBT life peers
Life peers created by Elizabeth II